"Crawling Back to You" is the third single taken from Never Gone, the fifth studio album released by American band Backstreet Boys. It was only released in the United States, where it was the final single from the album.

Background
The single was released in the United States on October 24, 2005, to coincide with the release of "I Still..." in other territories. The single was issued in support of 'Music For Hurricane Relief', a scheme set up to support the families hit by Hurricane Katrina. The single was released as a digital download, and a promotional CD single was also issued to radio stations. It was issued in a generic Jive card sleeve but with full artwork on the disc. The song peaked at number 30 on the US Billboard Adult Contemporary chart.

Track listing
 Digital download
 "Crawling Back to You" – 3:44
 "Weird World" – 4:11

Charts

References

2005 singles
2005 songs
Backstreet Boys songs
Jive Records singles
Songs written by Blair Daly
Songs written by Chris Farren (country musician)
Song recordings produced by John Fields (record producer)